Fuse or FUSE may refer to:

Devices
 Fuse (electrical), a device used in electrical systems to protect against excessive current
 Fuse (automotive), a class of fuses for vehicles
 Fuse (hydraulic), a device used in hydraulic systems to protect against sudden loss of fluid pressure
 Fuse (explosives) or fuze, the part of the device that initiates function
 Fuze or fuse, a mechanism for exploding military munitions such as bombs, shells, and mines

Computing
 Fuse ESB, an open-source integration platform based on Apache Camel
 Filesystem in Userspace, a virtual file system interface for Unix-like operating systems
 Fuse (emulator), the Free Unix Spectrum Emulator of the ZX Spectrum
 Fuse Internet Service, a former Cincinnati Bell Internet service provider based in Cincinnati, Ohio, United States
 Fuse Universal, a learning platform
 Adobe Fuse CC, formerly Fuse Character Creator, 3D computer graphics program, originally developed by Mixamo, used to create 3D characters.

Science
 Far Ultraviolet Spectroscopic Explorer, a space-based ultraviolet telescope and spectroscope
 Intramembranous ossification, the fusing of bones of the skeletal system
 Cell fusion, several biological cells combining
 Fuse (thermonuclear)
 Fused compound, a class of multi-ring chemical structures

Entertainment
 Fuse (film), a 2003 film by Pjer Žalica, original Bosnian title Gori vatra
 Fuse Teppō Musume no Torimonochō, a 2012 Japanese animated film
 Fuse (magazine), a Canadian arts and culture magazine

Music
 Fuse (band), an American rock group
 Fuse (Fuse album), 1970
 Fuse (Joe Henry album), 1999
 Fuse (Colin James album), 2000
 Fuse (Everything but the Girl album), 2023
 Fuse (Keith Urban album), 2013
 The Fuse (band), a band from the East of Scotland
 The Fuse (album), by Pennywise, 2005
 Fused (album), a 2005 album by Tony Iommi
 F.U.S.E., an alias for electronic artist Richie Hawtin
 Fuse Festival, an Australian contemporary music event
 "Fuse", an instrumental by Chaz Jankel from his 1980 album Chas Jankel
 "The Fuse", a song by Bruce Springsteen from his 2002 album The Rising
 "The Fuse", a song by Jackson Browne from his 1976 album The Pretender
 "The Fuse", a song by Heaven 17 from their 1984 album How Men Are

Radio and television
 Fuse (TV channel), an American cable television station
 Fuse (radio program), a musical radio program on CBC
 The Fuse (game show), a UK game show broadcast on ITV1

Games
 Fuse Games, a game developer
 Fuse (video game), a video game by Insomniac Games
 Fuse, a playable character in the game Apex Legends

Other uses
 Fuse, a consumer electronics company started by Tony Fadell
 Fuse (chocolate bar), a brand of chocolate bar made by Cadbury
 Fuse (surname), a Japanese surname
 Fuse, Shimane, a village located in Oki District, Shimane, Japan
 Scion Fuse, a concept car

See also
 Fews, Swedish-American rock band 
 Flare, also known as a fusee
 Fusebox (programming)
 Fusee (disambiguation)
 Fusion (disambiguation)
 Fuze (disambiguation)